Select was a United Kingdom music magazine of the 1990s. It was known for covering indie rock, but featured a wide array of music.

Launched in July 1990, its first cover star was Prince. After EMAP Metro bought Select, they revamped its image, and it became known for its coverage of Britpop, a term coined in the magazine by Stuart Maconie. Its 1993 "Yanks Go Home" edition, featuring The Auteurs, Denim, Saint Etienne, Pulp and Suede's Brett Anderson on the cover in front of a Union Flag, was an important impetus in defining the movement's opposition to American genres such as grunge.

Later, John Harris stepped down as editor, and was replaced by former Mixmag editor Alexis Petridis. Under Petridis, the magazine's image moved back towards its coverage on an eclectic array of music, aiming to reach what Petridis described as "a wide range of music fans". The magazine folded in late 2000, amid competition on the internet.

Tagline 

 Pop Babylon! (circa 1994)
 Music and Beyond (circa 1998)
 Music for Tomorrow (circa 2000)
 Total Stereo

Contributors 
 Andrew Perry, deputy editor
Harry Borden, visual contributor
Giles Duley
John Harris
Andrew Harrison
Graham Linehan
Steve Lowe, contributing editor
Dorian Lynskey
Stuart Maconie
Sarra Manning
Caitlin Moran
John Mullen, contributing editor
Sian Pattenden
David Quantick
Miranda Sawyer
Cass Spencer, art editor
Roy Wilkinson, reviews editor

References

External links 
Select magazine archive

Defunct magazines published in the United Kingdom
Magazines established in 1990
Magazines disestablished in 2001
Magazines published in London
Monthly magazines published in the United Kingdom
Music magazines published in the United Kingdom